Dhanraj Singh may refer to:
 Dhanraj Singh (politician) (1944–?), Indian politician
 Dhanraj Singh (boxer) (born 1947), Guyanese boxer
 Dhanraj Singh (cricketer) (born 1968), Indian cricketer